Blind is a 2011 South Korean crime thriller film directed by Ahn Sang-hoon with screenplay by Choi Min-seok which won the "Hit By Pitch" project fair held by the Korean Movie Producers Guild in 2009. It stars Kim Ha-neul and Yoo Seung-ho. Kim received Best Actress honors at the 48th Grand Bell Awards and the 32nd Blue Dragon Film Awards for her performance.

Plot
A missing person case involving a female university student and the victim in a hit and run case appears to be related. Detectives look for a witness.

Min Soo-ah used to be a promising cadet at the police academy but after a horrific car accident which killed her surrogate brother Dong-hyun and caused her to lose her eyesight, her police career ended. Soo-ah reveals to Detective Jo at the police station that on the night of the hit and run case she was picked up by a taxi cab driver. Soo-ah believes the taxi driver may be the perpetrator of the crimes. Initially, Detective Jo doesn't take Soo-ah's claims seriously because she is blind, but when Soo-ah displays her acute senses, the detective starts to believe her.

Detective Jo and Soo-ah then work together to find the taxi cab driver, but all their leads turn up empty. Then another witness comes forward, Kwon Gi-seob. Gi-seob is a motorcycle delivery boy who claims to have also witnessed the hit and run incident. Gi-seob emphatically states that the car in question was not a taxi cab, but rather an imported sedan.

Meanwhile, Soo-ah finds herself being stalked by a mysterious man who turns out to be the killer, gynecologist Myung-jin. Soo-ah, while in the car with him, remembered that he had a strong scent, he had a watch on his right hand, and he gave her an iced coffee drink in a glass can. While in the car with him, they hit a bump while in an argument. The body of the dead university student rolls out of the trunk and Myung-jin gets out to examine it. When Soo-ah goes out as well to inspect the damage done, he claims that he hit a dog, but she reasons with him, starting another fight. He leaves her in the rain when another car comes. The reason why she was in the car with him is because she needed a ride back from visiting the orphanage she used to grow up in.

One night when Gi-seob is walking home alone, he is followed by Myung-jin. Gi-seob at first runs away, but is snuck up on and hit by a brick. An ambulance comes and Detective Jo and Soo-ah drive to the scene. Gi-seob gets annoyed by Soo-ah's constant nagging, and on the day of his release, storms out in anger. When he reaches the nearly-empty subway station, he sees Soo-ah on the other side and then sees her ride the subway followed by the killer. He calls her on her phone and tells her urgently that the killer is in front of her. As he runs to catch up with her, she goes on FaceTime and shows him her location and surroundings. He guides her out of the subway and to safety, as well as her seeing eye dog, Seul-gi. She reaches into her handbag and sprays the killer's eyes with her pepper spray and runs off with Seul-gi. When she reaches the elevator, she thought that she'd be safe, but the killer quickly gets in and kills Seul-gi.

When Soo-ah wakes up, she asks for her seeing dog, but Gi-seob hands her the blood-stained leash. At home she gets a call from an unknown number. The caller warns her away from the case. "You can't see me, but I'm watching you." A few days later, Detective Jo finds the killer. They get into a violent fight, in which the detective dies and the killer drives off. Meanwhile, Gi-seob and Soo-ah visit the orphanage again when they're asked to watch over it while the school director takes the children out. The killer enters the living room and lights a cigarette and listens to some music. Soo-ah, annoyed by the music, goes downstairs to turn it off. She reprimands Gi-seob for playing it, but smells the cigarette smoke. Gi-seob goes upstairs and fights the killer while Soo-ah runs away, reaching the car and breaking its windows with the motion sensor. The killer attacks her but she hits him on the head, making him fall unconscious. The police find Detective Jo's body and other evidence implicating Myung-jin as the killer and he is put in jail. Soo-ah is re-admitted to the police academy and graduates, while Gi-seob also enrolls in the police academy.

Cast

 Kim Ha-neul as Min Soo-ah
 Kim Soo-jin as young Soo-ah 
 Yoo Seung-ho as Kwon Gi-seob
 Jo Hee-bong as Detective Jo
 Yang Young-jo as Myung-jin
 Park Bo-gum as Dong-hyun, Soo-ah's younger brother (career debut)
 Sung Yu-bin as young Dong-hyun 
 Dolly as Seul-gi
 Sa-hee as Jung-yeon
 Kim Mi-kyung as school director
 Choi Phillip as detective from Information Section
 Won Pung-yeon as Detective 1
 Jeon Joo-woo as Detective 4
 Kim Kyeong-ik as Doctor 2
 Baek Ik-nam as owner of car
 Han Yeo-wool as woman having an abortion

Reception

Critical reception
Derek Elley of Film Business Asia gave the film a 6 out of 10, saying it "has effective moments but doesn't fully realise its potential."

Awards

Remakes
China
A Chinese remake titled The Witness starring Yang Mi and Luhan and also directed by Ahn Sang-hoon, finished filming in 2015. It was released in China on October 30.

Japan
A Japanese remake titled , directed by Junichi Mori and starring Riho Yoshioka, Mahiro Takasugi, Kōji Ōkura, and Kōdai Asaka, was released in Japan on 20 September 2019.

India
In India the film has remade in two languages; in Tamil language as Netrikann (lit. The Third Eye) starring Nayanthara and in Hindi with the same name starring Sonam Kapoor and directed by Shome Makhija. The Hindi version wrapped up filming on February 13, 2021. The Tamil version was released on Disney+ Hotstar on 13 August 2021 and Hindi version is scheduled to release on ZEE5.

References

External links 
 
 
 

2011 films
2011 crime thriller films
South Korean crime thriller films
2010s Korean-language films
South Korean films remade in other languages
Police detective films
2010s serial killer films
Films about blind people
South Korean serial killer films
Next Entertainment World films
2010s South Korean films